The Royal Welsh College of Music & Drama is a conservatoire located in Cardiff, Wales. It includes three theatres: the Richard Burton Theatre, the Bute Theatre, and the Caird Studio. It also includes one concert hall, the Dora Stoutzker Hall. Its alumni include Anthony Hopkins, Aneurin Barnard and Rob Brydon.

History and description
The college was established in 1949 as Cardiff College of Music at Cardiff Castle, but has since moved to purpose-built accommodation within the castle grounds of Bute Park near Cardiff University. In 1970 it changed its name to the Welsh College of Music & Drama before being awarded its royal title during Queen Elizabeth II's golden jubilee in 2002, making it the fifth conservatoire to be awarded this title.

From 1973, the college's degrees were awarded by the University of Wales and in 2004 the college became part of the federal university. In 2007, however, it left the university and agreed to a merger (referred to as a "strategic alliance") with the University of Glamorgan. The University of Glamorgan merged with the University of Wales, Newport, in 2013 to form the University of South Wales, so RWCMD is now part of the University of South Wales Group.

The college provides education and training in the performing arts and technical theatre, with approximately two-thirds of its 550 students studying music-related courses and the rest studying drama and technical theatre related courses. It was the first, and is one of only two All-Steinway conservatoires in the UK, along with Leeds College of Music.

A £22.5m expansion of the college was opened in 2011, including two new performance venues (Richard Burton Theatre and Dora Stoutzker Hall), a new front of house area and rehearsal studios.

In 2010, as part of the college's 60th anniversary celebrations, students from the college performed in a gala concert at Buckingham Palace, attended by the college's patron, the Prince of Wales. A second gala evening was presented at Buckingham Palace in 2016 to celebrate the fifth anniversary of the college's new facilities.

It is a member of the Federation of Drama Schools.

Undergraduate degrees 
The college offers undergraduate degrees in the following areas:
 BMus (Hons) Music
 BMus (Hons) Jazz
 BA (Hons) Acting
 BA (Hons) Stage Management & Technical Theatre
 BA (Hons) Design for Performance
 BA (Hons) Musical Theatre
 Foundation Degree Scenic Construction

Postgraduate degrees 

The college also offers postgraduate degrees in the following areas;

 MA Acting for Stage, Screen & Radio
 MA Advanced Opera Performance
 MA Arts Management
 MA Design for Performance
 MA Jazz
 MA Musical Theatre
 MA Opera Directing
 MA Repetiteur Studies
 MA Stage & Event Management
 MMus Brass Band Conducting
 MMus Choral Conducting
 MMus Collaborative Piano
 MMus Composition
 MMus Historical Performance
 MMus Music Performance
 MMus Multi Instrument Woodwind Performance
 MMus Orchestral Conducting
 MMus Orchestral Performance
 Postgraduate Diploma Advanced Professional Practice
 Postgraduate Diploma in Brass Band Conducting
 Postgraduate Diploma in Choral Conducting
 Postgraduate Diploma in Collaborative Piano
 Postgraduate Diploma in Composition
 Postgraduate Diploma in Historical Performance
 Postgraduate Diploma in Jazz
 Postgraduate Diploma in Music Performance
 Postgraduate Diploma in Multi Instrument Woodwind Performance
 Postgraduate Diploma in Orchestral Conducting
 Postgraduate Diploma in Orchestral Performance

Alumni

 For a full list, see :Category:Alumni of the Royal Welsh College of Music & Drama

 Zahra Ahmadi
 Jan Anderson
 Rakie Ayola
 Aneurin Barnard
 Remy Beasley
 Joe Blackman
 Edward Bluemel
 Anthony Boyle
 Rob Brydon
 Hamish Clark
 Alun Cochrane
 Richard Elis
 Jean Fergusson
 Bradley Freegard
 Lucy Gaskell
 Paul Hilton
 Anthony Hopkins
 Anthony Irvine
 Peter Karrie
 Julian Lewis Jones
 Ruth Jones
 Jo Joyner
 James Loye
 Tony Maudsley
 Eve Myles
 Steven Meo
 Andrew Harwood Mills
 Adrian Lewis Morgan
 Olivia Morris
 Kimberley Nixon
 Naomi Radcliffe
 Erin Richards
 Ieuan Rhys
 Dougray Scott
 Ben Slade (joint course with UWIC)
 James Sutton
 David Thaxton
 Alexander Vlahos
 Victoria Wicks
 Katy Wix
 Mary Woodvine
 Royce Pierreson

References

External links
 
 

 
University of South Wales
Drama schools in the United Kingdom
Music schools in Wales
Education in Cardiff
Educational institutions established in 1949
1949 establishments in Wales
Music in Cardiff
Organisations based in Wales with royal patronage